My Aunt, Your Aunt is the English translation of the common German phrase, Meine Tante, deine Tante and may refer to:

Films
  My Aunt, Your Aunt (1927 film), English name of a German film screened in 1927 and known as Meine Tante, Deine Tante
  My Aunt, Your Aunt (1939 film), English name of a German film screened in 1939 and known as Meine Tante, Deine Tante
  My Aunt, Your Aunt (1956 film), English name of a German film screened in 1956 and known as Meine Tante, Deine Tante

Other
 Meine Tante - Deine Tante, a popular German card game